Pedomicrobium manganicum is a bacterium from the genus of Pedomicrobium which was isolated from quartzite rock pool in France.  Pedomicrobium manganicum has the ability to bind MnO2

References

Further reading 
 
 
 

Hyphomicrobiales
Bacteria described in 1961